Badalpur is a village in Jaunpur district in the state of Uttar Pradesh, in Northern India. At the time of the 2001 census it had a population of 2,000 and included 250 houses. Badlapur is like a Tahasil. There are many villages included such as Ghanshyampur, Khalispur, Leduka etc.

References

Villages in Jaunpur district